Triadenoides is one of 36 sections in the genus Hypericum which contains seven species. Its species are found in Socotra, Turkey, Syria, and Lebanon.

References

Triadenoides
Triadenoides